{{Speciesbox
| status = DD
| status_system = IUCN3.1
| status_ref = 
| taxon = Raiamas shariensis
| display_parents = 3
| authority = (Fowler, 1949)
| synonyms = *Barilius shariensis Fowler, 1949 
}}Raiamas shariensis is a species of ray-finned fish in the genus Raiamas''.

References 

Raiamas
Fish described in 1949
Taxobox binomials not recognized by IUCN